In management, information technology consulting (also called IT consulting, computer consultancy, business and technology services, computing consultancy, technology consulting, and IT advisory) is a field of activity which focuses on advising organizations on how best to use information technology (IT) in achieving their business objectives, but it can also refer more generally to IT outsourcing.

Once a business owner defines the needs to take a business to the next level, a decision maker will define a scope, cost and a time frame of the project. The role of the IT consultancy company is to support and nurture the company from the very beginning of the project until the end, and deliver the project not only in the scope, time and cost but also with complete customer satisfaction.

See also
List of major IT consulting firms
Consultant
Outsourcing

References

 
Software industry